The Roman Catholic Diocese of Jingxian/Kinghsien is a diocese located in Jingxian (Hengshui) in the Ecclesiastical province of Beijing in China.

History
 April 24, 1939: Established as the Apostolic Prefecture of Jingxian 景縣 from the Apostolic Vicariate of Xianxian 獻縣
 January 9, 1947: Promoted as Diocese of Jingxian 景縣

Leadership

Prefects Apostolic of Jingxian 景縣 (Roman Rite)
 Fr. Leopoldo Brellinger, S.J. (later Bishop) (May 4, 1939 – January 9, 1947)

Bishops of Jingxian 景縣 (Roman rite)
 Leopoldo Brellinger, S.J. (January 9, 1947 – September 18, 1967)
 Peter Fan Wenxing, Chinese Patriotic Catholic Association (December 20, 1981 - 1999)
 Thomas Gao Yuchen (1989 - ?)
 Mathias Chen Xilu, Chinese Patriotic Catholic Association (1999 - January 16, 2008)
 Peter Feng Xinmao (January 16, 2008 - Current)

References

 GCatholic.org
 Catholic Hierarchy
 Diocese website (Chinese) 

Roman Catholic dioceses in China
Christian organizations established in 1939
Roman Catholic dioceses and prelatures established in the 20th century
1939 establishments in China
Christianity in Hebei
Hengshui